Julidochromis marlieri is a species of cichlid endemic to Lake Tanganyika where it is only known from the northwestern portion preferring rocky shorelines in deep waters. In the aquarium trade, it is commonly known as Marlier's Julie, Spotted Julie or Chequered Julie. This species reaches a length of  TL. Adult females are larger than adult males.

Etymology
The specific name honours the Belgian zoologist Georges Marlier who collected the type.

See also
List of freshwater aquarium fish species

References

marlieri
Taxa named by Max Poll
Fish described in 1956
Fish of Lake Tanganyika
Taxonomy articles created by Polbot